Redwall is a fantasy novel by Brian Jacques. Originally published in 1986, it is the first book of the Redwall series. The book was illustrated by Gary Chalk, with the British cover illustration by Pete Lyon and the US cover by Troy Howell. It is also one of the three Redwall novels to be made into an animated television series (which is aired on PBS, but produced by the Canadian studio), along with Mattimeo (Season 2) and Martin the Warrior (Season 3).

Plot summary
A young anthropomorphic mouse named Matthias is a novice monk at Redwall Abbey, where he was adopted as a young orphan, though he dreams of a life of adventure, inspired by the legends of Martin the Warrior, the founder of Redwall. One summer, Redwall Abbey is surrounded by the army of Cluny the Scourge, an infamously evil one-eyed rat. Matthias is guided by visions of Martin the Warrior, while the abbey inhabitants prepare the defense of their home against Cluny's impending attack. Matthias seeks Martin's famous sword, supposedly hidden somewhere within the abbey, helped particularly by Methuselah, an ancient and grizzled mouse who serves as Redwall's historian. Cluny, meanwhile, attempts to gain entrance to the abbey and murders a defector from his horde, Sela the fox. Sela's son, Chickenhound, seeks refuge at Redwall but ends up accidentally killing Methuselah after being caught stealing. Driven from the abbey, Chickenhound is maimed in the wilderness by the venomous adder Asmodeus Poisonteeth, a local terror in Mossflower Wood, the forest that surrounds the abbey.

Clues to the location of Martin's sword and shield have been built into the abbey, allowing Matthias to recover the shield, though he discovers the sword has been stolen by a wild sparrow tribe, the Sparras, that dwell on Redwall's roof. He learns from the violent sparrows that the sword was stolen from them in turn by Asmodeus. The king of the sparrows attacks Matthias but dies when the two plummet together off the abbey roof. Matthias recovers and ventures to Asmodeus's lair with his new allies Log-a-Log, a shrew, and Warbeak Sparra, the new and just queen of the aforementioned Sparras. Matthias, Log-a-Log, and two other Shrews succeed in retrieving the sword from Asmodeus's cave, Asmodeus kills the latter two, and Matthias subsequently kills Asmodeus. Alerted to the fall of the abbey by the Sparra tribe, Matthias rushes back to Redwall to save his friends.

The Redwall inhabitants have been using boiling water, oil, barrels of hornets, and fire to repel Cluny's horde, but the abbey finally falls when Cluny threatens the family of the gatekeeper, who allows Cluny's forces access to the abbey. Matthias, his allies now including the Mossflower shrews and the whole Sparra tribe, along with the newly captive Redwall population, battles against Cluny's minions. Cluny strikes his poison-barb tail at the father abbot, Mortimer, but Matthias quickly avenges the abbot's injury by dropping the abbey's giant bell on top of Cluny, crushing him to death and cracking the bell in the process. Abbot Mortimer proclaims Matthias the Warrior of Redwall and dies from his wound. The battle ends in victory for the defenders of Redwall.

An epilogue reveals that Matthias has married the fieldmouse Cornflower and she has given birth to their son, Mattimeo, an abbreviated version of the name Matthias Methuselah Mortimer. The cracked Joseph Bell has been reshaped into two new bells called Matthias and Methuselah.

Discrepancies 
As Redwall was the first book set in the Redwall world, many of its defining traits were not yet developed, and are different from all subsequent books in the series:

The world 
Redwall appeared to take place in the real world. Cluny was referred to as a Portuguese water rat at one point. Additionally, Methuselah claimed that one of the accounts of Cluny comes from a town dog. The horse present in the early chapters was the size of a normal horse, and the wagon it pulled was scaled to the same size – an entire army of rats was able to ride in it. Also there was a mention of cows that trampled through a village. However, Brian Jacques did not expect the book to be published, and excluded references to humans and many larger animals in later books.
 Aside from the setting of the story—an Abbey with an abbot but no apparent religious observances—the St. Ninian's Church is the only reference to any kind of religion in any of the Redwall series, implying that at one point the residents of Mossflower practised Christianity. (Although later in the series, it is rumoured that originally, the sign outside the church said "This ain't Ninian's!", and some of the letters wore away.) Jacques firmly stated that the inhabitants of Redwall Abbey practice no religion of any kind. Cluny and his soldiers also mention Satan ("by Satan's nose" or "Hell's teeth"), referring to a belief in Hell. No other religious mentionings have happened in any of the later books. However, evil characters sometimes use the word "Hellgates" as a reference to death or dying. Dark Forest's Gates, or just Dark Forest refers to a place that characters' souls go after death.

Species discrepancy 
Redwall is the only book in the entire series that makes any mention of domesticated animals. Animals mentioned in this book – but never again in the series – include horse, dog, cow, and pig. Additionally, the Abbot mentions a "village where the dog and pigs reside", perhaps implying human habitation. In the books following this, the world of Redwall is inhabited only by wild fauna. However, in Eulalia! an owl refers to a cow in a song he sings. Moreover, various kinds of milks and cheeses are consumed by the inhabitants of Redwall, though no direct description of such farming or manufacture is ever made.
The beaver in Redwall is the only one to appear in the entire series. Its species has not been mentioned since.
Bees can communicate in Redwall, indicated by a statement at the end of the book where the Guerilla Shrews learned to speak the bee language so they could trade and argue. This was not noted in other books.
Foxes are indicated in Redwall as not inherently evil. It is mentioned that Abbot Mortimer used to trade tomes with "wandering healer foxes". Sela the vixen's brood of foxes was referred to as a bad lot, indicating that they were an exception and not the norm. In all later books, foxes are a "vermin" species.
Brother Methuselah mentions that it was Martin who gave the first Foremole his title; however, in Mossflower, Foremole is already known as such before Martin's arrival, though this is most likely because Mossflower, Martin's debut book, was published after Redwall.
In Redwall, the cat is scaled to real life compared to Matthias and Constance the Badger is depicted pulling a cart by herself, but in later books, badgers and wildcats are roughly the size of the other animals (if large).
In Redwall, Guosim was a character, a member of the Guerilla Shrews. In later books, the shrews themselves were referred to as the Guosim, and no mention of the character Guosim was made, even in Mattimeo. The Shrews did not rename themselves after her, either, indicated by the fact that they were referred to as Guosim in books chronologically earlier than Redwall. Furthermore, while the shrews appear in Redwall as an independent tribe with no alliance with the other "good" creatures, in books chronologically earlier they are shown as frequent allies. Log-a-Log, in addition, is always shown as their chief, while he is a mere ferry-shrew in Redwall. The customs of the tribe also changed dramatically: In Redwall the Guosim are democratic and the actions of the tribe are carried out by votes. In the books following, there is no voting, in fact the actions of the tribe fall primarily on the chieftain's decision. (However, it is unofficially mentioned in Redwall that "Guosim" stands for "Guerilla Union of Shrews in Mossflower."

Awards and nominations
Winner:
Lancashire Libraries Children's Book of the Year Award
Western Australian Young Readers' Award
Nominated:
Carnegie Medal

Publication history
Select print publications:
1986, UK, Hutchinson Children's Books Ltd., Pub. Date: October 1986, Hardback
1987, USA, Philomel Books, Pub. Date: August 1987, Hardback
1987, UK, Red Fox, Pub. Date: September 1987, Paperback
1990, USA, Avon Books, Pub. Date: March 1990, Paperback
1997, USA, G P Putnam's Sons, Pub. Date: September 1997, Hardback
1998, USA, Ace, Pub. Date: June 1998, Paperback
2002, USA, Thorndike Press, Pub. Date: February 2002, Hardback
2002, UK, Penguin Putnam Books, Pub. Date: September 2002, Paperback

Graphic novel

Redwall has been adapted into a graphic novel, titled Redwall: The Graphic Novel. It was released on 4 October 2007.

Musical
Redwall was adapted into a musical called Redwall: The Legend of Redwall Abbey, along with a cast of actors.

Proposed film adaptation
In February 2021, Netflix announced an animated feature film adaptation. It will be based on the self-titled first book of the novels and its script penned by Patrick McHale. In November 2022, McHale announced that he finished the script, but due to the changes at Netflix Animation, McHale left the project only a month later.

References

External links
 Redwall Books

Children's fantasy novels
British children's novels
British fantasy novels
Redwall books
1986 British novels
1986 fantasy novels
1986 children's books
Hutchinson (publisher) books
British novels adapted into films
British novels adapted into television shows
Fictional mice and rats